Tyehimba Jess (born 1965 in Detroit) is an American poet.  His book Olio received the 2017 Pulitzer Prize for Poetry.

Biography

Early life
Tyehimba Jess was born Jesse S. Goodwin. He grew up in Detroit, where his father worked in that city's Department of Health. His father later became the first vice president of Detroit's chapter of the National Association for the Advancement of Colored People (NAACP). Jess's mother was a teacher and nurse, who founded a nursing school at Wayne County Community College in 1972.

According to Jess, he started writing poetry at age 16. Within just a few years, when he was 18, he had won second prize for poetry at an NAACP academic competition. He graduated from high school in 1984. Next, he enrolled at the University of Chicago, where he intended to be an English major and pursue his poetry writing. However, he soon abandoned this as an option, and dropped out of the university in 1987. During this time, to support himself, Jess worked as an intern at a bank, as a community organizer, and as substitute teacher in the public school system in Chicago.

In 1989, he returned to the University of Chicago, and switched his major to Public Policy. Around the same time, he began to take classes at nearby University of Illinois at Chicago (UIC) with the poet and scholar Sterling D. Plumpp, who became a mentor, and he realized that his real passion was for poetry. Plumpp's classes focused on literary figures from the Harlem Renaissance and the Black Arts Movement of the 1960s and '70s, which inspired him to start writing again. He graduated from the University of Chicago in 1991, with a BA degree in Public Policy. He later pursued a MFA degree at New York University, which he received in 2004.

Career
As of 2017, Jess teaches poetry and fiction as an associate professor of English at the College of Staten Island of the City University of New York. He's a faculty member of The Watering Hole Organization, and is also the faculty adviser for Caesura, the college's literary arts magazine.

Jess's first book of poetry, leadbelly (Wave Books, 2005), was chosen by Brigit Pegeen Kelly as a winner in the 2004 National Poetry Series competition. Library Journal and Black Issues Book Review both named it one of the "Best Poetry Books of 2005".

In April 2016, Jess released his second full-length poetry collection, titled Olio.  This work has been described as "part fact, part fiction….sonnet, song and narrative to examine the lives of mostly unrecorded AfricanAmerican performers…." In his book he writes some poems in reference to Edmonia Lewis, John William Boone, Henry Box Brown, Paul Laurence Dunbar, Fisk Jubilee Singers, Ernest Hogan, Sissieretta Jones, Scott Joplin, Millie and Christine McKoy, Booker T. Washington, Blind Tom Wiggins, Bert Williams and George Walker.

Jess's work has appeared in Soul Fires: Young Black Men on Love and Violence, Obsidian III: Literature in the African Diaspora, Power Lines: Ten Years of Poetry from Chicago's Guild Complex, and Slam: The Art of Performance Poetry.

Works

Inspiration
Jess's inspiration for writing stems from his drive to express history through expression and performance.

Poetry
 "When I Speak of Blues Be Clear", Cave Canem
  
  
 "martha promise receives leadbelly, 1935", Poetry Foundation
 "harris county chain gang"; "home again"; "martha promise receives leadbelly, 1935", Perihelion
 
 Olio. Wave Books. 2016. .

Anthologies
Soulfires: Young Black Men in Love and Violence (1996). , 
Slam: The Competitive Art of Perform,ance Poetry (2000). , 
Dark Matter 2: Reading the Bones (2004). ,

Non-fiction
 
 "Ancestral Wealth – The Sacred Black Masculine in My Life", Boston Review, February 5, 2021.

Awards
 2000: Duncan YMCA Writer's Voice Fellow
 Illinois Arts Council Artist Roster
 2000: Illinois Arts Council Artist Fellowship 
 2001: Chicago Sun Times Poetry Award.
 2001: Gwendolyn Brooks Open Mic Poetry Awards
 2001–2002: Ragdale Fellow
 2004: National Poetry Series
 2004: NEA grant
 2006: Whiting Award
 2007: Lannan residency
 2017: Pulitzer Prize for Poetry
 2017: Anisfield-Wolf Book Award

References

External links
Tyehimba Jess's Wave Books author page
"Tyehimba Jess", Fishouse
"Tyehimba Jess", The Book of Voices
"NINE LIVES OF CHICAGO POETRY: TYEHIMBA JESS", Chicago Poetry
Poems by Tyehimba Jess at Nashville Review
Profile at The Whiting Foundation

1965 births
Living people
People from Staten Island
American male poets
New York University alumni
University of Detroit Jesuit High School and Academy alumni
University of Illinois Urbana-Champaign faculty
Yale University faculty
University of Chicago alumni
Writers from Detroit
Pulitzer Prize for Poetry winners
21st-century American poets
Poets from Michigan
Poets from New York (state)
College of Staten Island faculty
21st-century American male writers